Min barndoms jular is a Christmas album from Kikki Danielsson, released in December 1987. It peaked at 19th position at the Swedish Albums Chart

Album release
Years later, incorrect sources begun to state that the album was released on November 1, 1988.

The album combines old and newer Christmas songs, and is largely a concept album, as many of the songs wrre Kikki Danielsson's Christmas time childhood favourites. Many of the songs contain references to Christmas memories from childhood and youth, while other songs have a Christian Christmas theme, with the birth of Jesus as theme.

The album was rereleased on November 1, 2001, named Nu är det advent. This version also included "Nu är det advent", a duet with Janne Önnerud, as a "bonus track". This song, which became the first album track, was at Svensktoppen for six weeks during the period December 9, 2000 – January 27, 2001, peaking at #3.

Kikki Danielsson's daughter, who was born in 1985, featured on the cover of the album alongside Danielsson.

Track listing

1987 original

2001 bonus tracks

Charts

References

External links

1987 Christmas albums
Concept albums
Kikki Danielsson albums
Christmas albums by Swedish artists
Country Christmas albums
Pop Christmas albums